Amphipneustes tumescens is a species of sea urchin of the family Temnopleuridae. Their armour is covered with spines. It is placed in the genus Amphipneustes and lives in the sea. Amphipneustes tumescens was first scientifically described in 1926 by Koehler.

See also 
Amphipneustes rostratus (Koehler, 1926)
Amphipneustes similis (Mortensen, 1936)
Anabrissus damesi (Agassiz, 1881)

References 

Amphipneustes
Animals described in 1926